Buster's Happy Hour is the third album from Buster Poindexter, the alter ego of singer David Johansen.

Like his previous album Buster Goes Berserk, it features his backing band The Banshees of Blue, and features covers of rhythm and blues songs of the 1940s and 1950s. The cover of the album is a painting by David Johansen himself.

Track listing
 "Breakin' Up the House"
 "Big Fat Mamas Are Back in Style" 	
 "Doin' What I Please" (Fats Waller, Andy Razaf)
 "Let Me In"
 "I Got Loaded" 
 "Saturday Night Fish Fry" (Louis Jordan, Ellis Walsh)	- duet with Soozie Tyrell
 "Lavender Coffin"
 "Rocket 88" (Ike Turner, credited to Jackie Brenston)
 "The Worst Beer I Ever Had" 	
 "Who Drank My Beer (While I Was in the Rear)?" 	
 "Rockin' All Nite Long"
 "Knock'm Down Whiskey"	
 "Pink Champagne"
 "Drunk" - duet with Bill Morrissey
 "I'll Die Happy"
 "Butcher Pete (Parts 1 & 2)" (Roy Brown)	
 "Alcohol" (Ray Davies)

Personnel
Buster Poindexter - vocals
Randy Andos - tuba
Crispin Cioe - flute, alto, baritone and tenor saxophone
Laurence Etkin - trumpet, flugelhorn, piccolo trumpet
Bob Funk - trombone
Tony Garnier - upright bass, vocals
Charlie Giordano - piano, accordion, vocals
Arno Hecht - clarinet, baritone and tenor saxophone
Brian Koonin - banjo, guitar, vocals
Lisa Lowell - vocals
Tony Machine - drums, vocals
Sherryl Marshall - vocals
Bill Morrissey - vocals
Catherine Russell - vocals
Soozie Tyrell - violin, vocals
Fred Walcott - percussion, vocals

References

External links
NEW YORK DOLLS HOMEPAGE
David Johansen Resource

1994 albums
Buster Poindexter albums
Rhino Records albums